Nicira is a company focused on software-defined networking (SDN) and network virtualization. Nicira created their own proprietary versions of the OpenFlow, Open vSwitch, and OpenStack networking projects.

Nicira was co-founded in 2007 by Martin Casado, who served as the CTO, Nick McKeown and Scott Shenker.
On July 23, 2012, VMware announced they intended to acquire Nicira for $1.26 billion, a deal which closed the following month. Nicira technology was merged into VMware's vSwitch and marketed with the name NSX.

References

External links 
 Company home page

VMware
Companies based in Palo Alto, California
American companies established in 2007
Defunct software companies of the United States
2012 mergers and acquisitions